Strastnaya sed'mitsa (Страстна́я седми́ца ; The Passion Week) Op.58 is a 1911 Russian-language choral work by Alexander Grechaninov. The work shows the influence of Wagner rather than Russian nationalist musical trends.

Recordings
Grechaninov: Strastnaya sedmitsa Russian State Symphonic Cappella Valéry Polyansky 1999
Grechaninov: Passion Week, Op. 58 Phoenix Bach Choir & Kansas City Chorale, Charles Bruffy 2007

References

1911 compositions